Alex Bertani is an Italian editor who is the current director of the Italian comic book series Topolino (since 2018). Previously he worked for Panini Comics.

Biography
With a degree in economics, he was hired by the Italian office of Marvel Comics in 1994, working in a variety of roles.

In 2016 he began directing "Mercato Italiano Publishing." Then in October 2018 he was nominated to become editorial director of Topolini, succeeding Valentina De Poli.

References

Italian magazine editors
Living people
Italian journalists
Comics magazines published in Italy
Donald Duck comics
Year of birth missing (living people)